Bukama is a territory in the Haut-Lomami province of the Democratic Republic of the Congo.

Politics
Bukama Territory is represented in the National Assembly by five deputies:
Prosper Kabila (GSCO)
Edmond Kabongo (UDCO)
Ida Kitwe (FSIR)
Émile Christophe Mota (UNAFEC)
Paul Mutonkole (ECT)

Territories of Haut-Lomami Province